David Frayne was an Anglican priest and Provost of Blackburn Cathedral.

He was educated at Reigate Grammar School and St Edmund Hall, Oxford, and ordained in 1961. He was Curate at St Michael, East Wickham, and then Priest in charge of St Barnabas, Downham. He held incumbencies at The Barn Church, Kew, Caterham, Redcliffe, Bristol, and Bedminster before he was appointed Provost of Blackburn in December 1992.

Frayne retired in September 2001 as Dean following the reclassification of all Provosts the previous year.

References

1934 births
People educated at Reigate Grammar School
Alumni of St Edmund Hall, Oxford
Provosts and Deans of Blackburn
Living people